Samuel Smith House may refer to:
 Samuel Smith House (East Lyme, Connecticut), listed on the National Register of Historic Places (NRHP)
Samuel L. Smith House, Detroit, Michigan, NRHP-listed
Samuel Smith House and Tannery, Greenfield, Ohio, NRHP-listed

See also
Smith House